Pseudacraea boisduvali, or Boisduval's false acraea, is a butterfly of the family Nymphalidae. It has an extensive range which includes much of the tropics and subtropics of sub-Saharan Africa.

Description

The wingspan is 65–70 mm for males and 75–88 mm for females. A large and most beautiful species. As in hostilia, the hindwing is yellow-red to red-yellow with black, red-spotted marginal band, but that of boisduvali has in the basal part large rounded black spots. Fore wing in the distal part more or less semitransparent with thick black longitudinal streaks between the veins, at least in cellules 2 and 3; the black spots in the basal half are large and rounded and are present both in the cell and in cellules 1a–2; it should be specially noted that one of these spots is placed on vein 2. The species is considerably larger than Acraea egina, but mimics it almost exactly and has also local races corresponding to those of egina.

Biology
Adults are on wing year round, with a peak from January to May.

The larvae feed on the foliage of various members of the Sapotaceae, namely Chrysophyllum, Mimusops (including M. obovata and M. zeyheri), Manilkara discolor and Englerophytum (including E. magalismontanum and E. natalense).

Subspecies

Pseudacraea boisduvali boisduvali — Sierra Leone to Zaire, Angola, Uganda, Sudan, western Kenya
Pseudacraea boisduvali trimenii Butler, 1874 — Port St Johns to KwaZulu-Natal, Eswatini, Mozambique, Zimbabwe, Malawi, Tanzania, eastern Kenya
Pseudacraea boisduvali sayonis Ungemach, 1932 — southern Ethiopia
Pseudacraea boisduvali marsabitensis Jackson & Howarth, 1957 — Marsabit, Mount Kulal, Mount Nyiro (all in Kenya)
Pseudacraea boisduvali pemba Kielland, 1990 — Pemba Island

Mimicry
Pseudacraea boisduvali is, with Acraea egina and Graphium ridleyanus, a member of a mimicry complex.

References

Butterflies described in 1845
Limenitidinae